The Samsung Galaxy Tab 7.0 Plus (GT-P6200[L]) it was a tablet computer of a series of Android-based tablet computer produced by Samsung, introduced in October 2011.
 
It belongs to the midlife first generation of the Samsung Galaxy Tab series, which consists of two 10.1" models, an 8.9", a 7.0" and a 7.7" model.

The Samsung Galaxy Tab 7.0 Plus is seen to be more of an update even by Samsung rather than a successor to the original Samsung Galaxy Tab 7.0.

References

External links
Samsung Galaxy Note 9 - Facts vs Rumors

Galaxy Tab 7.0 Plus
Tablet computers